Anomalopus mackayi, commonly known as the five-clawed worm skink, long-legged worm skink, and MacKay's burrowing skink, is a species of smooth-scaled burrowing skink, a lizard in the family Scincidae. The species is endemic to eastern Australia.

Etymology
The specific name, mackayi, is in honor of Australian herpetologist Roy D. MacKay.

Behaviour and habitat
A. mackayi generally burrows in areas with black soil and few trees.

Description
A. mackayi generally grows to the size of about  snout-vent length (SVL). It is similar to Anomalopus leuckartii but with distinctly didactyle (having two digits) hindlimbs, a central dark spot within each individual scale, and is yellow-green below with darker flecks (Cogger 2000).

Reproduction
Adult females of A. mackayi give birth to live young.

Conservation status
A. mackayi is listed as Vulnerable under the IUCN Red List, and as Endangered under Queensland's Nature Conservation Act 1992.

References

Further reading
Cogger H (2014). Reptiles and Amphibians of Australia, Seventh Edition. Clayton, Victoria, Australia: CSIRO Publishing. xxx + 1,033 pp. .
Greer AE, Cogger HG (1985). "Systematics of the reduce-limbed and limbless skinks currently assigned to the genus Anomalopus (Lacertilia: Scincidae)". Records of the Australian Museum 37 (1): 11–54. (Anomalopus mackayi, new species).
Groombridge B (editor) (1994). 1994 IUCN Red List of Threatened Animals. Gland, Switzerland: International Union for the Conservation of Nature (IUCN).
Wilson, Steve; Swan, Gerry (2013). A Complete Guide to Reptiles of Australia, Fourth Edition. Sydney: New Holland Publishers. 522 pp. .

External links
"Anomalus mackayi ". Australian Government, Department of the Environment.  Five-clawed worm skink.

Anomalopus
Skinks of Australia
Vulnerable fauna of Australia
Nature Conservation Act endangered biota
Reptiles described in 1985
Taxa named by Allen Eddy Greer
Taxa named by Harold Cogger